Santa María Jalapa del Marqués is a small city in the Mexican state of Oaxaca. It serves as the administrative centre for the surrounding municipality (municipio) of the same name. 
It is part of the Tehuantepec District in the west of the Istmo Region.

The city

It stands on Federal Highway 190, on the southern shore of the Presa Juárez reservoir.

The municipality
As municipal seat, Santa María Jalapa del Marqués has governing jurisdiction over the following communities:

Arroyo las Truchas, Benito Juárez Chica, Campamento de la Victoria (Quinta la Iguana), Cerro del Chivo, Cerro del Marqués, Colonia Presidente Juárez, El Arenal, El Reparo, El Tamarindo, Granja del Ángel, Guadalupe Victoria, Guichiquero, Llano Grande, Llano Vería, Loma Bonita, Magdalena Guelavence, Peña San Juan, Pochotillo, San Cristóbal, Santa Elena de la Cruz, Solo Dios, and Vishiñadu (El Palenque)

Municipalities of Oaxaca